Forster Square in central Bradford was redeveloped in the (2006) Broadway development, but gives its name to Bradford Forster Square railway station and a retail park.

History 

Forster Square was laid out in the late-19th century at the bottom of Kirkgate, and named after the 19th-century politician William Edward Forster. Until 1958, it was a spacious city square, triangular in shape, with public gardens and a statue of Forster in the centre; it was also a busy hub for bus and tram services.

Forster Square railway station fronted partly onto the square from 1924 until 1990, when the current station of that name opened  to the north. The former station was demolished.

In the 1950s and 1960s, much of central Bradford was redeveloped to the design of Stanley Wardley. This included a new main road, Petergate, linking a remodelled Forster Square to Leeds Road at Eastbrook Well roundabout. Part of the gardens remained as a walled enclave in a busy traffic roundabout, accessible to pedestrians only by underpasses. Two large buildings were built on the west side: Central House and Forster House, a John Poulson design. Apart from the railway station, the only building fronting the square that survived redevelopment was St Peter's House, which was once the central post office.

On 18 March 2004, work began to clear the site of Forster Square for redevelopment as part of the Broadway project. Forster House was demolished to make room for the new development. A new road (Lower Kirkgate) was built linking the junction of Kirkgate and Cheapside with the junction of Canal Road and Bolton Road. There is no longer a through route from the north (Canal Road or Manor Row) to Leeds Road since then.

In late 2006, the site was empty and flat except for a large pile of rubble in one part of the site. For the first time for many years, St Peter's House and Bradford Cathedral behind it are visible from the centre of the city.

Construction work on the Broadway project was expected to be completed in 2007. Developers Westfield said that work would not commence until tenants were found.

Archaeological discoveries 

Since the demolition, archaeologists have had a chance to excavate the area between Forster Square and Cheapside. They have found traces of what were most probably 16th-century buildings. Smaller finds have also been found such as coins, pottery and clay tobacco pipes, a bone spoon and a bone toothbrush.

Andrea Burgess, senior archaeologist at West Yorkshire Archaeology Advisory Service, said:

She also hoped that the findings would reveal more about life in Bradford during the English Civil War:

See also 
 Little Germany, Bradford

References

External links 
 Westfield current developers of the Bradford, Broadway scheme
 Bradford Regeneration Homepage
 Bradford City Metropolitan District Council Website
 Connecting the City Works to enable the Broadway project.

Areas of Bradford
Squares in England